Elliott River may refer to:

In Australia
 Elliott River (Queensland), a watercourse in the Wide Bay–Burnett region of Queensland
 Elliot River (Whitsunday Region, Queensland), a watercourse in North Queensland
 Elliott River (Victoria), a watercourse in Victoria

Elsewhere
 Elliott River (Canada)